Trethomas Bluebirds A.F.C. are a Welsh football team based in  the village Trethomas in the Caerphilly County Borough. The club plays in the Ardal Leagues South East, tier 3 of the Welsh football pyramid.

History
The club was formed in 1903 as Trethomas Football Club.  The pitch was bought by the miners who worked at the mine and coke works of Bedwas & Trethomas.  The name Bluebirds came from one of the founders who was a Cardiff City supporter.  The club entered the Gwent County League in 2003, winning promotion to Division Two as Champions in 2005–06. Promotion to Division One followed after the club finished as runners-up in the 2012–13 season.

They were promoted to the Welsh Football League in 2015–16 for the first time.

Honours

 Gwent County League Division One Champions (1): 2015–16
 Gwent County League Division Two Runners-up (1):  2012–13
 Gwent County League Division Three Champions (1): 2005–06
Ardal South Cup – Winners: 2021–22

References

External links
 Official website

Football clubs in Wales
Gwent County League clubs
Welsh Football League clubs
Ardal Leagues clubs